Belgium competed at the 1988 Winter Paralympics in Innsbruck, Austria. Two competitors from Belgium won zero medals and finished 16th in the medal table.

Both competitors competed in alpine skiing.

Alpine skiing 

Pierre de Coster competed in the Downhill B2 and Giant Slalom B2 events and Willy Mercier competed in the Downhill B1 and Giant Slalom B1 events.

See also 

 Belgium at the Paralympics
 Belgium at the 1988 Winter Olympics

References 

1988
1988 in Belgian sport
Nations at the 1988 Winter Paralympics